George Arthur Rolt Worth (born 8 October 1996) is an English rugby union full back for Melbourne Rebels in Australia's Super Rugby AU.  He has previously played for Leicester Tigers in England's Premiership Rugby and for Coventry and Nottingham on loan from Leicester.

Career
He made his Tigers debut against Bath at the Rec in May 2016 at the age of 19 having been a Tigers season ticket holder since the age of 7. He went to Wymondham College in Norfolk as a boarder, attending from school years 7 to 11, and playing in the same school rugby team as fellow Leicester Tiger Will Evans.

On 3 March 2021 Worth moved on loan to Melbourne Rebels in Australia's Super Rugby AU for the 2021 season.

On 11 August 2021, he was released from his Leicester contract, and on 15 September it was announced he had re-joined the Melbourne Rebels on a one year contract.

Super Rugby statistics

References

1996 births
Living people
English rugby union players
Leicester Tigers players
Rugby union fullbacks
Coventry R.F.C. players
Nottingham R.F.C. players
Melbourne Rebels players
English expatriate rugby union players
Expatriate rugby union players in Australia
Rugby union players from Peterborough